Centre-right politics lean to the right of the political spectrum, but are closer to the centre. From the 1780s to the 1880s, there was a shift in the Western world of social class structure and the economy, moving away from the nobility and mercantilism, towards capitalism. This general economic shift toward capitalism affected centre-right movements, such as the Conservative Party of the United Kingdom, which responded by becoming supportive of capitalism.

The International Democrat Union is an alliance of centre-right (as well as some further right-wing) political parties – including the UK Conservative Party, the Conservative Party of Canada, the Republican Party of the United States, the Liberal Party of Australia, the New Zealand National Party and Christian democratic parties – which declares commitment to human rights as well as economic development.

Ideologies characterised as centre-right include liberal conservatism and some variants of liberalism and Christian democracy, among others. The economic aspects of the modern centre-right have been influenced by economic liberalism, generally supporting free markets, limited government spending and other policies heavily associated with neoliberalism. The moderate right is neither universally socially conservative nor culturally liberal, and often combines both beliefs with support for civil liberties and elements of traditionalism.

Historical examples of centre-right schools of thought include One Nation Conservatism in the United Kingdom, Red Tories in Canada, and Rockefeller Republicans in the United States. New Democrats in the United States also embraced several aspects of centre-right policy, including balanced budgets, free trade, deregulation, and welfare reform. These ideological factions contrast with far-right policies and right-wing populism. They also tend to be more supportive of cultural liberalism and green conservatism than right-wing variants.

According to a 2019 study, centre-right parties had approximately 27% of the vote share in 21 Western democracies in 2018. This was a decline from 37% in 1960.

History

French Revolution to World War II
The prominent inspiration for the centre-right (especially in Britain) was the traditionalist conservatism of Edmund Burke. Burke's traditionalist conservatism was more moderate than the continental conservatism developed by Joseph de Maistre in France, that upon experiencing the French Revolution completely denounced the status quo that existed immediately prior to the revolution (unlike Burke) and de Maistre sought a reactionary counter-revolution that would dismantle all modern society and return it to a strictly religious-based society. While Burke condemned the French Revolution, he had supported the American Revolution that he viewed as being a conservative revolution. Burke claimed that the Americans revolted for the same reason as the English had during the Glorious Revolution, in both cases a monarch had overstepped the boundaries of his duties. Burke claimed that the American Revolution was justified because King George III had overstepped his customary rights by imposing taxes on the American colonists without their consent. Burke opposed the French Revolution because he opposed its anti-traditionalism and its use of abstract ideas, such as the Declaration of the Rights of Man and of the Citizen and its universal egalitarianism that Burke rebuked by claiming that it effectively endorsed "hairdressers" being able to be politicians.

In Britain, the traditionalist conservative movement was represented in the British Conservative Party. Conservative Prime Minister of the United Kingdom Benjamin Disraeli sought to address social problems affecting the working class due to lack of assistance from the laissez-faire economy and formed his one nation conservatism that claimed that lack of assistance for the lower classes had divided British society into two nations – the rich and the poor as the result of unrestrained private enterprise, he claimed that he sought to break down. Disraeli said that he supported a united British nation while presenting the other parties representing the upper-class or the lower-class. Disraeli was hostile to free trade and preferred aristocratic paternalism as well as promoting imperialism. However, with the revival in Britain of the socialist movement with the rise of the Labour Party and the demise of the Liberal Party, the Conservative Party shifted to become a supporter of capitalism and an opponent of socialism, while advocacy of capitalism was promoted within the principles of traditionalist conservatism.

Another centre-right movement that arose in France in response to the French Revolution was the beginning of the Christian democracy movement, where moderate conservative Catholics accepted the democratic elements of the French Revolution. The first Christian democratic party was founded in Italy in 1919 by Luigi Sturzo, but it was suppressed by the Italian Fascist regime and was forced into exile in France. In France, Sturzo founded an international movement that supported the creation of a European common market and European integration to prevent war, amongst those who attended the group included future German Chancellor Konrad Adenauer, Alcide de Gasperi and Robert Schuman.

Post–World War II

In Europe after World War II, centre-right Christian democratic parties arose as powerful political movements while the Catholic traditionalist movements in Europe diminished in strength. Christian democratic movements became major movements in Austria, the Benelux countries, Germany and Italy.

Neoliberalism arose as an economic theory by Milton Friedman that condemned government interventionism in the economy that it associated with socialism and collectivism. Neoliberals rejected Keynesian economics that they claimed advocate too much emphasis on relieving unemployment in response to their observance of the Great Depression, identifying the real problem as being with inflation and advocate the policy of monetarism to deal with inflation.

Neoliberal economics was endorsed by Conservative British Prime Minister Margaret Thatcher who adapted it as part of a free-market conservatism closer to the developments in American conservatism, while traditionalist conservatism became less influential within the British Conservative Party. However, the British Conservative Party still has a large traditional conservative base, particularly the conservative Cornerstone Group. Thatcher publicly supported centre-right politics and supported its spread in Eastern Europe after the end of the Marxist-Leninist regimes in the late 1980s and early 1990s. After the collapse of communism in Eastern Europe, a variety of centre-right political parties have emerged there, including many that support neoliberalism.

In the United States, President Ronald Reagan (1981–1989) adopted many policies stemming from Milton Friedman's economic theories, including principles from the Chicago school of economics and monetarism. While social conservatives and the rise of the Christian Right contributed greatly to forming the Reagan Coalition, the President also had the support of centre-right economic neoliberals. Using Friedman's neoliberal theories, the Reagan administration cut the marginal income tax from 70% to 28% and slowed government spending growth from 10% in 1982 to 1% in 1987, thereby reducing inflation from 13.5% to 4.1% and civilian unemployment from 7.6% to 5.5% of the workforce throughout his tenure.

See also

References

Political spectrum
Political terminology
Right-wing politics
Centrism